Prasinopyra is a genus of moths of the family Noctuidae. The genus was erected by George Hampson in 1914.

Species
Prasinopyra metacausta (Hampson, 1910) Cuba
Prasinopyra metaleuca (Schaus, 1912) Costa Rica
Prasinopyra semifascia (Dyar, 1920) Mexico

References

Acontiinae